Events from the year 1535 in Sweden

Incumbents
 Monarch – Gustav I

Events

 13 January - Swedish victory at the Battle of Helsingborg (1535).
 20 April - The appearance of Sun dogs leads to the painting of the Vädersolstavlan.
 June - Swedish victory at the Battle of Bornholm (1535).
 11 June - Swedish victory at the Battle of Öxnebjerg.
 16 June – Swedish victory at the Battle of Little Belt.
 November – Swedish victory at the Sea Battle of Copenhagen.

Births

 22 July - Catherine Stenbock, queen  (died 1621)

Deaths

 July - Gustav Trolle, archbishop (born 1488)
 23 September - Catherine of Saxe-Lauenburg, queen (born 1513)

References

External links

 
Years of the 16th century in Sweden
Sweden